Victor Rasmus Nielsen (25 January 1883 – 27 October 1962) was an Australian rules footballer who played with Melbourne in the Victorian Football League (VFL).

Notes

External links 

Profile on DemonWiki

1883 births
1962 deaths
Australian rules footballers from Melbourne
Melbourne Football Club players
Footscray Football Club (VFA) players
People from South Melbourne